Dana Ruth Bash (born June 15, 1971; née Schwartz) is an American journalist, news anchor, and chief political correspondent for CNN.

Early life and education
Bash was born Dana Ruth Schwartz in Manhattan, New York City, into a Jewish family, to Frances (née Weinman) Schwartz, an author and educator in Jewish studies, and Stuart Schwartz, an ABC News producer who served as the senior broadcast producer for Good Morning America. She grew up living in Washington, D.C., and New Jersey. Bash attended Pascack Hills High School in Montvale, New Jersey. She graduated cum laude with a bachelor's degree in political communications from George Washington University. While at college, she interned at NBC, CBS, and CNN. On May 12, 2018, Bash received an honorary Doctorate of Humane Letters from Franklin Pierce University in Rindge, New Hampshire.

Career
After college, Bash joined CNN as a producer of their weekend programs such as Late Edition, Evans & Novak, and Inside Politics (later occasionally appearing on-air in the absence of regular host John King). Later, she began producing programming specializing in coverage of the United States Senate where she would eventually become CNN's Chief Congressional Correspondent. In 2021, Bash joined Jake Tapper to become co-host of CNN's Sunday morning show State of The Union.

Bash was one of the women honored at Elle magazine's 2014 "Women in Washington Power List" event.

Bash was host of the 2019 Democratic presidential primary debate where Kamala Harris was noted for making her "that little girl was me" statement to Joe Biden.

Personal life

From 1998 to 2007, Bash was married to Jeremy Bash, who would become CIA chief of staff and Department of Defense chief of staff under President Barack Obama. In 2008, she married fellow CNN correspondent John King. Bash gave birth to a son in 2011; she and King divorced in 2012.

In 2011, she resigned as a trustee of Jewish Women International under pressure over its abortion-rights advocacy. A number of conservative blogs had highlighted the group's position on abortion after Bash accepted the trustee position.

Notes

References

External links
 Dana Bash's profile at CNN
 
 
 

1971 births
American television reporters and correspondents
CNN people
George Washington University School of Media and Public Affairs alumni
Living people
Pascack Hills High School alumni
People from Montvale, New Jersey
American women television journalists
Jewish American journalists
Schwartz family (television)
20th-century American Jews
21st-century American Jews